Simkhada or Shimkhada is a surname belonging to the Khas people of both the Bahun and Chhetri caste from Nepal.

Notable people with the surname Simkhada include:
Deepak Shimkhada, born September 5, 1945) is a Nepali American educator, artist, art historian, author and community leader
Rajan Simkhada,  Nepali entrepreneur, author, social worker and a comedian actor
Sushma Shimkhada, Nepali sculptor
, member of Hong Kong canto pop group Collar with the name Day

References

Ethnic groups in Nepal
Nepali-language surnames
Khas surnames
Brahmin communities